is retired Japanese lightweight kickboxer.  He won the Japanese national tournament of K-1 at Lightweight in 2011.

In June 2020, Kubo announced his retirement from kickboxing, and transition into coaching at his own gym: "PURGE TOKYO". He's also announced his desire to box.

Kenji Kubo, his younger brother, is a kickboxer too.

Biography

Early life
Yuta Kubo was put practicing taekwondo at age of 8 with his younger brother, Kenji under Zanichi Korean family friend. He  eventually took up kickboxing at the age of 15.

Debut
On January 22, 2005, he made a debut as a professional kickboxer on NJKF at featherweight(-57.15 kg). He was a high school student then.

Winning K-1 tournament
On June 25, 2011, Kubo won the tournament in the lightweight class. He was going to retire if he lost and visited his sponsors to tell them on the day before tournament.

On February 17, 2012, Kubo defeated Charles François via second-round knockout to win the vacant ISKA World Light-Welterweight (64.5 kg) Championship in Tokyo, Japan.

On June 8, 2012, At Krush 18 in Tokyo, Japan, Yuta faced who was talked to be his toughest challenge in Top Welterweight Abdellah Ezbiri (5x France Champion, WKN European Champion, WKA World Champion). Prior to this fight Ezbiri revealed in an interview that he was shot in the face when he was a teenager. Despite his aggressive style Ezbiri seemed gun shy in the 1st round giving it to his opponent. Yuta dropped Ezbiri twice in the second, the 1st time with a right hook, the second with a spinning back fist but got up both times showing extreme toughness and heart and stayed on his feet in the 3rd even though Kubo is known for finishing his opponents quickly when he smells blood. Yuta Kubo won the fight by decision 3-0.

He was expected to make his middleweight (-70 kg) debut at Glory 4: Tokyo - 2012 Heavyweight Grand Slam on December 2, 2012 against an unnamed opponent but it fell through after the event was moved back to December 31 and combined with Dream 18.

Kubo competed in the Krush Grand Prix 2013 ~67kg First Class Tournament~ on January 14, 2012 and was initially set to fight Houcine Bennoui in the quarter-finals. However, Bennoui pulled out and was replaced by Roman Mailov. Mailov then sustained an injury in training as well, though, and lowly-ranked TaCa was brought in as Kubo's third opponent. He stopped TaCa with one of his signature body shots in round two. In the semis, Kubo dropped Shintaro Matsukura with a first round punch to the body and cruised to a unanimous decision but not without taking significant damage to his lead leg. A rematch with Abdellah Ezbiri then awaited him in the final. Kubo started the fight well but the tide started to turn in round two when Ezbiri began taking advantage of his injured leg to the point where he was having trouble standing. The bout was scored a unanimous draw after the regulation three rounds and so it went to a first extension round which was called a majority draw, much to the distaste of the crowd who booed the decision as they believed Ezbiri was dominant. Kubo rallied in the second extension round to take a unanimous decision, winning the tournament and the inaugural Krush 67 kg title.

He established himself as the world's top 65 kg fighter by winning the eight-man tournament at Glory 8: Tokyo - 2013 65kg Slam on May 3, 2013. He KO'd Lim Chi-Bin with a second round body shot in the quarter-finals before taking unanimous decision victories over Gabriel Varga and Masaaki Noiri in the semis and final, respectively.

Kubo had his three year-spanning, seventeen fight win streak broken in his rubber match with Masaaki Noiri at Krush.32 in Nagoya, Japan on September 1, 2013, losing his Krush 67 kg title in the process. He was docked a point for excessive clinching in round three, allowing Noiri to take a wide unanimous decision.

He lost to Mosab Amrani by unanimous decision at Glory 13: Tokyo - Welterweight World Championship Tournament in Tokyo, Japan on December 21, 2013.

Mixed martial arts career
Kubo was scheduled to make his mixed martial arts debut, as a featherweight, against Shinobu Ota at Rizin 30 on September 19, 2021. He lost the fight by unanimous decision.

Kubo faced Youtuber Shibatar in a mixed rules bout at Rizin 33 - Saitama on December 31, 2021. The bout will be two 3 min rounds, with no decision, and the winner only being able to win via KO or submission.  Kubo lost the bout via flying armbar in the first round.

Kubo faced Keisuke Okuda at Rizin Landmark 4 on November 6, 2022. He won the fight by TKO stoppage at the end of the first round.

Championships and accomplishments

Titles
New Japan Kickboxing Federation
 2007 NJKF Featherweight champion

World Professional Muaythai Federation
2007 WPMO World Super featherweight champion

Krush
 2009 Krush Lightweight GP runner-up
 2013 Krush Grand Prix ~67 kg Tournament~ Winner
 2013 Krush 67 kg Championship

K-1
 2010 K-1 World MAX -63kg Japan Tournament Runner-up
 2011 K-1 World MAX -63kg Japan Tournament Champion
 2017 K-1 World GP -67.5kg Championship Tournament Winner (Defended three titmes)

International Sport Kickboxing Association
 2012 ISKA K-1 World Light-Welterweight (64.5 kg) Champion

GLORY
 2013 Glory 65kg Slam Tournament Champion

Awards
 2005 Best Rookie Award (NJKF, January 15, 2006)
 2005 Gong Kakutogi Magazine Award (NJKF, January 15, 2006)
 2005 Full Contact Karate Magazine Award (NJKF, January 15, 2006)
 2006 Technique Award (NJKF, December 23, 2006)
 2007 Technique Award (NJKF, January 6, 2008)

Mixed martial arts record

|-
|Win
|align=center|1–1
|Keisuke Okuda
|TKO (elbows and punches)
|Rizin Landmark 4
|
|align=center|1
|align=center|4:43
|Nagoya, Japan
|
|-
|Loss
|align=center|0–1
|Shinobu Ota
|Decision (unanimous)
|Rizin 30
|
|align=center|3
|align=center|5:00
|Saitama, Japan
|

Kickboxing record

|-  style="background:#cfc;"
| 2020-03-22||Win ||align=left| Jordann Pikeur || K-1: K’Festa 3 || Saitama, Japan || Decision (Unanimous)|| 3|| 3:00|| 49-10-1
|-
! style=background:white colspan=9 |
|-
|-  bgcolor=#CCFFCC
| 2019-03-10|| Win ||align=left| Yasuhiro Kido || K-1 World GP 2019: K’FESTA 2 || Saitama, Japan || Ext.R Decision (Split) || 4 || 3:00|| 48-10-1
|-
! style=background:white colspan=9 |
|-
|-  bgcolor=#CCFFCC
| 2018-03-21 || Win || align=left| Melsik Baghdasaryan || K-1 World GP 2018: K'FESTA.1 || Saitama, Japan || Decision (Unanimous) || 3 || 3:00|| 47-10-1
|-  
! style=background:white colspan=9 |
|-
|-  bgcolor=#CCFFCC
| 2017-09-18|| Win ||align=left| Mohan Dragon  ||K-1 World GP 2016 -67.5kg World Tournament, Final|| Tokyo, Japan || Decision (Unanimous) || 3 || 3:00 || 46-10-1
|-
! style=background:white colspan=9 |
|-
|-  bgcolor=#CCFFCC
| 2017-09-18|| Win ||align=left| Hitoshi Tsukakoshi  ||K-1 World GP 2016 -67.5kg World Tournament, Semi Finals|| Tokyo, Japan || TKO (2 Knockdowns) || 1 || 2:36 || 45-10-1
|-
|-  bgcolor=#CCFFCC
| 2017-09-18|| Win ||align=left| Minoru Kimura ||K-1 World GP 2016 -67.5kg World Tournament, Quarter Finals|| Tokyo, Japan || Decision (unanimous) || 3 || 3:00 || 44-10-1
|-  bgcolor=#FFBBBB
| 2017-01-14 || Loss ||align=left| Xie Lei || 2016 World Kickboxing Championship || Zhengzhou, China || Decision (unanimous) || 3 || 3:00 || 43-10-1
|-
|-  bgcolor=#CCFFCC
| 2016-11-02 || Win ||align=left| Keita Makihira  || K-1 World GP in Japan Featherweight Championship Tournament|| Tokyo, Japan || Decision (unanimous) || 3 || 3:00 || 43-9-1
|-
|-  bgcolor=#FFBBBB
| 2016-03-04 || Loss ||align=left| Hideaki Yamazaki || K-1 World GP 2016 -65kg Japan Tournament, Semi Finals || Tokyo, Japan || TKO (2 Knockdowns/Hook kick) || 3 || 2:57 || 42-9-1
|-
|-  bgcolor=#CCFFCC
| 2016-03-04 || Win ||align=left| Noman || K-1 World GP 2016 -65kg Japan Tournament, Quarter Finals || Tokyo, Japan || Decision (unanimous) || 3 || 3:00 || 42-8-1
|-
|-  bgcolor=#FFBBBB
| 2015-04-19 || Loss ||align=left| Yasuomi Soda || K-1 World GP 2015 -55kg Championship Tournament || Tokyo, Japan || Decision (unanimous) || 3 || 3:00 || 41-8-1
|-
|-  bgcolor=#FFBBBB
| 2014-11-03 || Loss ||align=left| Kaew Fairtex || K-1 World GP 2014 -65kg Championship Tournament, Semi Finals || Tokyo, Japan || KO (Right Hook) || 2 || 1:52 || 41-7-1
|-
|-  bgcolor=#CCFFCC
| 2014-11-03 || Win ||align=left| Raz Sarkisjan || K-1 World GP 2014 -65kg Championship Tournament, Quarter Finals || Tokyo, Japan || Decision (Unanimous) || 3 || 3:00 || 41-6-1
|-
|-  bgcolor=#FFBBBB
| 2013-12-21 || Loss ||align=left| Mosab Amrani || Glory 13: Tokyo || Tokyo, Japan || Decision (unanimous) || 3 || 3:00 || 40-6-1
|-
|-  bgcolor=#FFBBBB
| 2013-09-01 || Loss ||align=left| Masaaki Noiri || Krush.32 || Nagoya, Japan || Decision (unanimous) || 3 || 3:00 || 40-5-1
|-
! style=background:white colspan=9 |
|-
|- style="" bgcolor=#CCFFCC
| 2013-05-03 || Win ||align=left| Masaaki Noiri || Glory 8: Tokyo - 65 kg Slam Tournament, Final || Tokyo, Japan || Decision (unanimous) || 3 || 3:00 || 40-4-1 
|-
! style=background:white colspan=9 |
|-
|- style="" bgcolor=#CCFFCC
| 2013-05-03 || Win ||align=left| Gabriel Varga || Glory 8: Tokyo - 65 kg Slam Tournament, Semi Finals || Tokyo, Japan || Decision (unanimous) || 3 || 3:00 || 39-4-1 
|-
|- style="" bgcolor=#CCFFCC
| 2013-05-03 || Win ||align=left| Lim Chi-Bin || Glory 8: Tokyo - 65 kg Slam Tournament, Quarter Finals || Tokyo, Japan || KO (body shot) || 2 || || 38-4-1 
|-
|- style="" bgcolor=#CCFFCC
| 2013-01-14 || Win ||align=left| Abdellah Ezbiri || Krush Grand Prix 2013 ~67 kg Tournament~, Final || Tokyo, Japan || 2nd Ext.R Decision (unanimous) || 5 || 3:00 || 37-4-1
|-
! style=background:white colspan=9 |
|-
|- style="" bgcolor=#CCFFCC
| 2013-01-14 || Win ||align=left| Shintaro Matsukura || Krush Grand Prix 2013 ~67 kg Tournament~, Semi Finals || Tokyo, Japan || Decision (unanimous) || 3 || 3:00 || 36-4-1
|-
|- style="" bgcolor=#CCFFCC
| 2013-01-14 || Win ||align=left| TaCa || Krush Grand Prix 2013 ~67 kg Tournament~, Quarter Finals || Tokyo, Japan || KO (body punch) || 2 || 1:43 || 35-4-1
|-
|- style="" bgcolor=#CCFFCC
| 2012-08-26 || Win ||align=left| Yuya Yamato || Krush.22|| Tokyo, Japan || KO (left high kick)|| 2 || 0:51 || 34-4-1 
|-
|- style="" bgcolor=#CCFFCC
| 2012-06-08 || Win ||align=left| Abdellah Ezbiri || Krush.19|| Tokyo, Japan || Decision (Unanimous)|| 3 || 3:00 || 33-4-1 
|-
|- style="" bgcolor=#CCFFCC
| 2012-02-17 || Win ||align=left| Charles François || Krush.16|| Tokyo, Japan || KO (punch to the body)|| 2 || 2:18 || 32-4-1 
|-
! style=background:white colspan=9 |
|-
|-  bgcolor=#CCFFCC
| 2011-12-31 || Win ||align=left| Nils Widlund || Fight For Japan: Genki Desu Ka Omisoka 2011 || Saitama, Japan || KO (Right High Kick) || 3 || 1:10 || 31-4-1 
|-
|-  bgcolor=#CCFFCC
| 2011-11-12 || Win ||align=left| Tristan Benard || Krush.13 || Tokyo, Japan || KO (Right Hook) || 3 || 0:52 || 30-4-1 
|-
|-  bgcolor=#CCFFCC
| 2011-09-25 || Win ||align=left| Andre Brul || K-1 World MAX 2011 -70kg Japan Tournament Final || Osaka, Japan || Decision (Unanimous) || 3 || 3:00 || 29-4-1 
|-
|-  bgcolor=#CCFFCC
| 2011-06-25 || Win ||align=left| Koya Urabe || K-1 World MAX 2011 -63kg Japan Tournament Final, Final || Shibuya, Tokyo, Japan || Decision (Unanimous) || 3 || 3:00 || 28-4-1 
|-
! style=background:white colspan=9 |
|-
|-  bgcolor=#CCFFCC
| 2011-06-25 || Win ||align=left| Masaaki Noiri || K-1 World MAX 2011 -63kg Japan Tournament Final, Semi-final || Shibuya, Tokyo, Japan || Decision (Unanimous) || 3 || 3:00 || 27-4-1 
|-  bgcolor=#CCFFCC
| 2011-06-25 || Win ||align=left| Kizaemon Saiga || K-1 World MAX 2011 -63kg Japan Tournament Final, Quarter-final || Shibuya, Tokyo, Japan || Decision (Unanimous) || 3 || 3:00 || 26-4-1 
|-  bgcolor=#CCFFCC
| 2010-09-20 || Win ||align=left| Densiam Lukprabaht || Survivor -Round.7- || Shinjuku, Tokyo, Japan || KO (Left hook) || 3 || 0:53 || 25-4-1
|-  bgcolor=#CCFFCC
| 2010-11-08 || Win ||align=left| Hiroya|| K-1 World MAX 2010 -70kg World Championship Tournament Final || Sumida, Tokyo, Japan || Decision (Unanimous) || 3 || 3:00 || 24-4-1
|-  bgcolor=#FFBBBB
| 2010-07-05 || Loss ||align=left| Tetsuya Yamato || K-1 World MAX 2010 -63kg Japan Tournament Final, Final || Shibuya, Tokyo, Japan || KO (Right hook) || 3 || 1:26 || 23-4-1
|-
! style=background:white colspan=9 |
|-
|-  bgcolor=#CCFFCC
| 2010-07-05 || Win ||align=left| Yoshimichi Matsumoto || K-1 World MAX 2010 –63 kg Japan Tournament Final, Semi-final || Shibuya, Tokyo, Japan || KO (Brazilian kick) || 1 || 1:21 || 23-3-1
|-  bgcolor=#CCFFCC
| 2010-07-05 || Win ||align=left| Keiji Ozaki || K-1 World MAX 2010 –63 kg Japan Tournament Final, Quarter-final  || Shibuya, Tokyo, Japan || Decision (Unanimous) || 3 || 3:00 || 22-3-1
|-  bgcolor=#CCFFCC
| 2010-05-02 || Win ||align=left| Taiki Hata || K-1 World MAX 2010 -63kg Japan Tournament Final 16, First Round of 22 || Bunkyō, Tokyo, Japan || Decision (Unanimous) || 3 || 3:00 || 21-3-1
|-  bgcolor=#CCFFCC
| 2010-03-13 || Win ||align=left| Junpei Aotsu || Krush × Survivor || Bunkyō, Tokyo, Japan || Decision (Unanimous) || 3 || 3:00 || 20-3-1
|-  bgcolor=#CCFFCC
| 2009-12-09 || Win ||align=left| Tsuyoshi || M&J Presents Survivor Round.2 || Shinjuku, Tokyo, Japan || Decision (Unanimous) || 3 || 3:00 || 19-3-1
|-  bgcolor=#FFBBBB
| 2009-11-02 || Loss ||align=left| Masahiro Yamamoto || Krush Lightweight GP 2009 -Final Round-, Final || Bunkyō, Tokyo, Japan || Decision (Unanimous) || 3 || 3:00 || 18-3-1
|-  bgcolor=#CCFFCC
| 2009-11-02 || Win ||align=left| Yosuke Mizuochi || Krush Lightweight GP 2009 -Final Round-, Reserve match  || Bunkyō, Tokyo, Japan || Decision (Majority) || 3 || 3:00 || 18-2-1
|-  bgcolor=#CCFFCC
| 2009-09-28 || Win ||align=left| Takehiro Murahama || M&J Presents Survivor Opening Round.1 || Shinjuku, Tokyo, Japan || KO (Left cross) || 1 || 2:43 || 17-2-1
|-  bgcolor=#c5d2ea
| 2008-04-29 || Draw ||align=left| Takashi Nagatsuka || MAJKF "Break Through - 3"  || Kōtō, Tokyo, Japan || Decision (Split) || 5 || 3:00 || 16-2-1
|-
! style=background:white colspan=9 |
|-
|-  bgcolor=#FFBBBB
| 2008-01-27 || Loss ||align=left| Shunta Ito || NJKF "Start Of New Legend" || Bunkyō, Tokyo, Japan || Decision (Unanimous) || 3 || 3:00 || 16-2-0
|-  bgcolor=#FFBBBB
| 2007-11-21 || Loss ||align=left| Nuang Solia || Removing Land Mines Charity　Event || Cambodia || Decision (Unanimous) || 5 || 3:00 || 16-1-0
|-  bgcolor=#CCFFCC
| 2007-09-2 || Win ||align=left| Soug-Uk Lee || NJKF "Fighting Evolution VIII -The Next Generation-" || Bunkyō, Tokyo, Japan || KO (Left knee shot) || 3 || 2:55 || 16-0-0
|-  bgcolor=#CCFFCC
| 2007-07-13 || Win ||align=left| Chaichana Patong Gym || World Muay Thai Federation Championship || Phuket, Thailand || KO (Right knee strike) || 5 ||  || 15-0-0
|-
! style=background:white colspan=9 |
|-
|-  bgcolor=#CCFFCC
| 2007-05-13 || Win ||align=left| Farkamwang SKV Gym || NJKF "Fighting Evolution VI" || Kōtō, Tokyo, Japan || Decision (Majority) || 5 || 3:00 || 14-0-0
|-  bgcolor=#CCFFCC
| 2007-03-18 || Win ||align=left| Nobuhiro Iwai || NJKF "Fighting Evolution III  -3 Kings Champion Carnival-"|| Bunkyō, Tokyo, Japan || TKO (Cut) || 2 || 1:43 || 13-0-0
|-
! style=background:white colspan=9 |
|-
|-  bgcolor=#CCFFCC
| 2007-01-28 || Win ||align=left| Daniel || NJKF "Fighting Evolution II -Muay Thai Open-"  || Kōtō, Tokyo, Japan || Decision (Unanimous) || 3 || 3:00 || 12-0-0
|-  bgcolor=#CCFFCC
| 2006-12-05 || Win ||align=left| Somdet Por.Pantie || Thai King's Birthday  || Sanam Luang, Thailand || KO (Knee shot) || 4 ||  || 11-0-0
|-
! style=background:white colspan=9 |
|-
|-  bgcolor=#CCFFCC
| 2006-09-16 || Win ||align=left| Kenpeth Shinongchai ||  Rajadamnern Stadium || Bangkok, Thailand || KO || 3 ||  || 10-0-0
|-  bgcolor=#CCFFCC
| 2006-09-10 || Win ||align=left| Nichau Sithaikeriangtor || Rajadamnern Stadium || Bangkok, Thailand || TKO || 3 ||  || 9-0-0
|-  bgcolor=#CCFFCC
| 2006-05-03 || Win ||align=left| Masato Ōkawa || NJKF "Advance IV" || Bunkyō, Tokyo, Japan || Decision (Unanimous) || 5 || 3:00 || 8-0-0
|-
! style=background:white colspan=9 |
|-
|-  bgcolor=#CCFFCC
| 2006-03-05 || Win ||align=left| Shōgo Kokubun || NJKF "Advance II" || Bunkyō, Tokyo, Japan || Decision (Unanimous) || 5 || 3:00 || 7-0-0
|-  bgcolor=#CCFFCC
| 2005-11-20 || Win ||align=left| Yoshiaki Takano || NJKF "Infinite Challenge X" || Bunkyō, Tokyo, Japan || TKO (Corner stoppage) || 4 || 2:05 || 6-0-0
|-  bgcolor=#CCFFCC
| 2005-09-24 || Win ||align=left| Shōkō || NJKF "Infinite Challenge VIII" || Bunkyō, Tokyo, Japan || KO (Left high kick) || 1 || 2:52 || 5-0-0
|-  bgcolor=#CCFFCC
| 2005-07-23 || Win ||align=left| Kozaru || NJKF "Infinite Challenge VII" || Bunkyō, Tokyo, Japan || KO || 3 || 1:56 || 4-0-0
|-  bgcolor=#CCFFCC
| 2005-05-03 || Win ||align=left| Hiuma || NJKF "Infinite Challenge IV" || Bunkyō, Tokyo, Japan || Decision (Unanimous) || 3 || 3:00 || 3-0-0
|-  bgcolor=#CCFFCC
| 2005-03-12 || Win ||align=left| Thriller Hideo || NJKF "Infinite Challenge II" || Bunkyō, Tokyo, Japan || Decision (Unanimous) || 3 || 3:00 || 2-0-0
|-  bgcolor=#CCFFCC
| 2005-01-22 || Win ||align=left| Shinji Aseishi || NJKF "Infinite Challenge I" || Bunkyō, Tokyo, Japan || Decision (Unanimous) || 3 || 3:00 || 1-0-0
|-
| colspan=9 | Legend:

See also
List of K-1 champions

References

External links
Kubo Yuta Official Blog
Kubo Yuta Official Twitter
K-1 Profile

1987 births
Living people
Japanese male taekwondo practitioners
Japanese male kickboxers
Featherweight kickboxers
Lightweight kickboxers
Japanese male mixed martial artists
Mixed martial artists utilizing taekwondo
People from Tokyo